Ken Munshaw is a Canadian country singer/songwriter. Munshaw has released three studio albums, Human Condition (1995), Time Tells All (2006) and Short Stories (2008). He has charted four chart singles on the Canadian country music charts, of which the highest was the No. 17-peaking "Let's Kiss and Make Up," a duet with Beverley Mahood.

Discography

Albums

Singles

Guest singles

External links
Official Site
Kenny Munshaw at Songs and Songwriters

Canadian male singer-songwriters
Canadian country singer-songwriters
Living people
Year of birth missing (living people)
Musicians from Toronto